Renato Sellani (8 January 1926 – 31 October 2014) was an Italian jazz pianist and composer.

Life and career
Born in Senigallia, Sellani started his professional career in 1954, when he entered the Basso-Valdambrini Quintet. In 1958 he started a long collaboration with his longtime friend Franco Cerri. He was part of the RAI National Symphony Orchestra directed by Gorni Kramer. As a pianist, he collaborated with Chet Baker, Billie Holiday, Dizzie Gillespie, Lee Konitz, Bill Coleman, Gerry Mulligan, Enrico Rava and Tony Scott, among others.

Sellani was an incidental music composer for stage plays, and his works include several scores  for the Piccolo Teatro in Milan and a long collaboration with the stage company of Tino Buazzelli.

References

External links
 
 Renato Sellani at Discogs
 

1926 births
2014 deaths
People from the Province of Ancona
Italian jazz pianists
Italian male pianists
Italian composers
Italian male composers
20th-century pianists
20th-century Italian musicians
20th-century Italian male musicians
Male jazz musicians